Ioanid is a Romanian surname. People with this surname include:

Costache Ioanid
Ion Ioanid
Alexandru and Paul Ioanid of the Ioanid Gang

Romanian-language surnames